Baghcheh-ye Maryam (also Romanized as Bāghcheh-ye Maryam and Bāghcheh Maryam; also known as Baghīcheh Maryam) is a village in Quri Chay Rural District, in the Central District of Dehgolan County, Kurdistan Province, Iran. At the 2006 census, its population was 144, in 30 families. The village is populated by Kurds.

References 

Towns and villages in Dehgolan County
Kurdish settlements in Kurdistan Province